The 1978 McNeese State Cowboys football team was an American football team that represented McNeese State University as a member of the Southland Conference (Southland) during the 1978 NCAA Division I-A football season. In their ninth year under head coach Jack Doland, the team compiled an overall record of 7–4, with a mark of 2–3 in conference play, and finished tied for fourth in the Southland.

Schedule

References

McNeese State
McNeese Cowboys football seasons
McNeese State Cowboys football